Zirconium(IV) sulfide is the inorganic compound with the formula ZrS2.  It is a violet-brown solid. It adopts a layered structure similar to that of cadmium iodide.

Like the closely related titanium disulfide, ZrS2 is prepared by heating sulfur and zirconium metal.  It can be purified by vapor transport using iodine.

References

Sulfides
Zirconium(IV) compounds
Transition metal dichalcogenides